6th National Board of Review AwardsDecember 20, 1934
The 6th National Board of Review Awards were announced on December 20, 1934.

Top Ten Films 
It Happened One Night
The Count of Monte Cristo
Crime Without Passion
Eskimo
The First World War
The Lost Patrol
Lot in Sodom
No Greater Glory
The Thin Man
Viva Villa!

Top Foreign Films 
Man of Aran
The Blue Light
Catherine the Great
The Constant Nymph
Madame Bovary

Winners 
Best Film: It Happened One Night
Best Foreign Language Film: Man of Aran

External links 
National Board of Review of Motion Pictures :: Awards for 1934

1934
1934 film awards
1934 in American cinema